In complex analysis, the open mapping theorem states that if U is a domain of the complex plane C and f : U → C is a non-constant holomorphic function, then f is an open map (i.e. it sends open subsets of U to open subsets of C, and we have invariance of domain.).

The open mapping theorem points to the sharp difference between holomorphy and real-differentiability. On the real line, for example, the differentiable function f(x) = x2 is not an open map, as the image of the open interval (−1, 1) is the half-open interval [0, 1). 

The theorem for example implies that a non-constant holomorphic function cannot map an open disk onto a portion of any line embedded in the complex plane. Images of holomorphic functions can be of real dimension zero (if constant) or two (if non-constant) but never of dimension 1.

Proof

Assume f : U → C is a non-constant holomorphic function and U is a domain of the complex plane. We have to show that every point in f(U) is an interior point of f(U), i.e. that every point in f(U) has a neighborhood (open disk) which is also in f(U).

Consider an arbitrary w0 in f(U). Then there exists a point z0 in U such that w0 = f(z0). Since U is open, we can find d > 0 such that the closed disk B around z0 with radius d is fully contained in U. Consider the function g(z) = f(z)−w0. Note that z0 is a root of the function. 

We know that g(z) is not constant and holomorphic. The roots of g are isolated by the identity theorem, and by further decreasing the radius of the image disk d, we can assure that g(z) has only a single root in B (although this single root may have multiplicity greater than 1).

The boundary of B is a circle and hence a compact set, on which |g(z)| is a positive continuous function, so the extreme value theorem guarantees the existence of a positive minimum e, that is, e is the minimum of |g(z)| for z on the boundary of B and e > 0. 

Denote by D the open disk around w0 with radius e. By Rouché's theorem, the function g(z) = f(z)−w0 will have the same number of roots (counted with multiplicity) in B as h(z):=f(z)−w1 for any w1  in D.  This is because 
h(z) = g(z) + (w0 - w1), and for z on the boundary of B, |g(z)| ≥ e > |w0 - w1|.  Thus, for every w1 in D, there exists at least one z1 in B such that f(z1) = w1. This means that the disk D is contained in f(B). 

The image of the ball B, f(B) is a subset of the image of U, f(U). Thus w0 is an interior point of f(U). Since w0 was arbitrary in f(U) we know that f(U) is open. Since U was arbitrary, the function f is open.

Applications 
Maximum modulus principle
Rouché's theorem
Schwarz lemma

See also 
 Open mapping theorem (functional analysis)

References 
 

Theorems in complex analysis
Articles containing proofs